Violetta (minor planet designation: 557 Violetta) is a minor planet orbiting the Sun that was discovered by German astronomer Max Wolf on 26 January 1905 in Heidelberg. In light of M. F. Wolf's penchant ca. 1905 for naming asteroids after operatic heroines, it is likely that 557 Violetta is named after the protagonist of Giuseppe Verdi's famous opera La Traviata.

Photometric observations of this asteroid made during 2008 at the Organ Mesa Observatory in Las Cruces, New Mexico, gave a light curve with a period of 5.0887 ± 0.0001 hours and a brightness variation of 0.25 ± 0.03 in magnitude.

References

External links
 
 

000557
Discoveries by Max Wolf
Named minor planets
Giuseppe Verdi
19050126